Lorna the Exorcist is a 1974 French horror film directed by Jesús Franco.

Cast

References

External links 

1974 horror films
1974 films
French horror films
Films directed by Jesús Franco
1970s French films